Dalailama is a genus of moths of the family Endromidae, previously placed in the subfamily Oberthueriinae of the family Bombycidae.

Species
Dalailama bifurca Staudinger, 1896
Dalailama vadim Witt, 2006

References

 

Endromidae